Lev Hakak is an Israeli-born American lawyer, academic, novelist and poet. He is a Professor of Hebrew Language and Literature at the University of California, Los Angeles (UCLA) and the author of several books on Hebrew literature. He has written four poetry collections and two novels.

Early life
Lev Hakak was born in 1944 in Israel. His parents were Iraqi Jews who experienced pro-Nazi antisemitic sentiments in Iraq in the 1940s and emigrated to Israel in 1951-1952.

Hakak graduated from the Hebrew University of Jerusalem, where he received a bachelor of arts degree in Hebrew Literature and Political Science in 1967. He attended graduate school at Tel Aviv University in 1968-1970, and he earned a PhD in Modern Hebrew Literature from UCLA in 1974. His thesis was entitled Modes of Organization in Modern Hebrew Free Verse.

Career
Hakak began his career as a poet in the early 1960s, when he published two poetry collections. In 1977, he published his first novel, The Ingathered. His work challenges the canon of Hebrew literature. He has published articles in The Huffington Post.

Hakak has been a Professor of Hebrew Language and Literature at UCLA since 1974. He is the author of several scholarly books on Hebrew Literature. His first scholarly volume, published in 1977, focused on poets Avraham Ben-Yitzhak, Amir Gilboa, Natan Zakh and Shlomo Zamir. In 1981, he was one of the first scholars to analyze Mizrahi Jews in Hebrew Literature. His 2009 book, The Emergence of Modern Hebrew Literature in Babylon from 1735-1950, is about Jewish poetry in Iraq.

Hakak is also a member of the Israel Bar Association and the State Bar of California.

Personal life
Hakak resides in Beverly Hills, California. In 2016, he was one of 24 Beverly Hills residents who submitted an application for an appointment to fill a vacancy on the Beverly Hills City Council after councilmember William W. Brien resigned. However, Hakak withdrew his application prior to the interview.

Works

Poetry collections

Novels

Hakak, Lev. A House on a Hill (1994).

Short Stories

Scholarly books

Hakak, Lev. Budding of Modern Hebrew Creativity in Babylon (Hebrew). The Babylonian Jewry Heritage Center, Research Institute of Babylonian Jewry, 2003. 371 pp.
Hakak, Lev. The Collected Essays of Rabbi SHelomo Bekhor Hutsin. Hakkibutz Hameuchad, 2005 (Hebrew). 281 pp.
Hakak, Lev. A Pious Man Faces Sinners: The Book of Moral Reroof by Ezra Habavli (Hebrew). Hakibbutz Hameuchad, 2008. 329 pp.
Introduction, References and Synopses by Lev Hakak. Sasson Mordekhai Mosheh, The Voice of Mirth (Hebrew). Hakibbutz Hameuchad, 2015.231 pp.

Hakak, Lev. Beneath the Sugarcoating: The Voice of Mirth by Sasson Mordekhai Mosheh, with Introduction, References and Synopses. The Babylonian Jewry Heritage Center, Research Institute of Babylonian Jewry. 2012. 415 pp.
Hakak, Lev. Song of the Whitewasher. Hadassa Word Press, 2016. 75 pp.*
Hakak, Lev. The Gift of Life. Hadassa Word Press, 2018. 120 pages. 
Hakak, Lev. Reading Modern Hebrew Poetry and Prose. Hadassa Word Press, 2017. 321 pp.

Editorial Work

Hakak, Lev, Editor of Hadoar, the Hebrew Quarterly of Histadruth Ivrith of America, September 2002 - Summer 2004.
Hakak, Lev, Editor of Hador: The Hebrew Annual of America, 2006 on.
Hakak, Lev, Co-Editor with Zev Garber, Shmuel (Stephen) Katz and Zev Garber.  The Maskil in Our Time: Studies in Honor of Moshe Pelli. Hakkibutz Hameuchad, 2017.

References

  1. Tugend, Tom (March 24, 2003). "Iraqi Jews in L.A.: War is necessary evil". Jewish Telegraphic Agency. Retrieved 
     May 28, 2016.
  2. Tugend, Tom (March 27, 2003). "Anxiety and Hope". The Jewish Journal of Greater Los Angeles. Retrieved May 28, 2016.
  3. Abramson, Glenda (2004). Encyclopedia of Modern Jewish Culture. New York: Routledge. . OCLC 57470923.
  4. "Modes of organization in modern Hebrew free verse". WorldCat. Retrieved May 28, 2016.
  5. Alcalay, Ammiel (1996). Keys to the Garden: New Israeli Writing. San Francisco, California: City Lights Books. 
     p. 286. . OCLC 32859679.
   6. "Lev Hakak". The Huffington Post. Retrieved May 28, 2016.
   7. "Lev Hakak". Purdue University Press. Retrieved May 28, 2016.
   8. Sabar, Yona (Fall 2012). "Reviewed Work: The Emergence of Modern Hebrew Creativity in Babylon, 1735–1950 by 
      Lev Hakak". Shofar. 31 (1): 147. JSTOR 10.5703/shofar.31.1.147. (Registration required (help)).
   9. Minutes of the May 31, 2016 special meeting of the Beverly Hills city council
   10. "Councilmember William W. Brien Stepping Down May 2016". Canyon News. April 13, 2016.
   11.  Alex Raskin, 'Stranger Among Brothers', Los Angeles Times, April 12, 1988.
   12.  Howard, Kaplan. 'Strangers',  A Novel of Dual Identities. Jewish Journal, April 28, 1988.
   13.  Arieh Winwman, 'Im Eshkahekh". Hebrew STudies, 23 (1982), pp. 265–266.
   14.  Esther Fuchs, “Equivocal Dreams: Studies in Modern Hebrew Literature”, Shofar, Purdue University Press, 
        Volume 15, Number 3, Spring 1997, pp. 111–114.
   15.  Shmuel Moreh. Lev Hakak - a Baghdad Born Scholar, Poet and Writer. In Yahadut Bavel: A Periodical for The 
        Research of the History and Culture of Babylonian Jews, No. 2, Babylonian Jewry Heritage Center, Hebrew pp. 
        1117–140; English pp. 41–46. 
   16.  Shmuel Moreh, The Literature of Babylonian Jews in the Work of Lev Hakak. Pe'amim No. 130, Yad Ben Zvi, 
        2012, pp. 233–244.
   17.  Yair Mazor, “The Budding of Modern Hebrew Creativity in Babylon: The Collected Essays of Rabbi Shelomo 
        Bekhor Hutsin”, by Lev Hakak". Shofar, An Intredisciplinary Journal of Jewish Studies,  Vol. 25, No. 3, 
        2007, pp. 207–208.
   18.  Yona Sabar, “Rewriting Literary History”. The Jerusalem Post, June 3, 2005.
   19.  Yair Mazor, “The Collected Essays of Rabbi Shelomo Bekhor Hutsin, by Lev Hakak”. Shofar, An 
        Interdisciplinary Journal of Jewish Studies,  Vol. 25, No. 3, 2007, pp. 207–208.
   20.  Rachel Simon, “Hakak, Lev: The Emergence of Modern Hebrew Creativity in Babylon, 1735-1950.” Association of 
        Jewish Librarian (AJL), February/March 2010, p. 35.
   21.  Sabar, Yona. The Emergence of Modern Hebrew Creativity in Babylon, 1735-1950. Shofar, Fall 2012, Vol. 31, 
        No.1, P. 147.
   22.  Rina Donchin, Modern Hebrew Literature Made into Films by Lev Hakak. National Association of Professors of 
        Hebrew, Vol. 13 (2010), pp. 169–170
   23.  Professor Lev Hakak on The Filming of Israeli Literature". The Jewish Post, New York State 31 Monthly Jewish 
        Newspaper, September 2003
   24.  Itamar Drori. Two Books by Lev Hakak: Reading Modern Hebrew Poetry and Prose, 336 pp;  Song of the 
        Whitewasher, 88 pp. Hebrew Higher Education, N0. 20, 2018, pp. 1–7.
   25.  Kritz, Ori. Hakak, Lev. In the Encyclopedia of Jews in the Islamic World. Brill

External links
UCLA webpage

Living people
1944 births
Israeli emigrants to the United States
People from Beverly Hills, California
Hebrew University of Jerusalem alumni
Tel Aviv University alumni
University of California, Los Angeles alumni
University of California, Los Angeles faculty
American people of Iraqi-Jewish descent
Israeli lawyers
California lawyers
20th-century Israeli poets
20th-century American poets
Israeli novelists
20th-century American novelists
American male novelists
American male poets
Israeli male poets
20th-century American male writers
Novelists from California